Finally Bhalobasa (English: "Finally Love", 2019) is an Indian Bengali language anthology film directed by Anjan Dutt. The film includes 3 stories and explores different dimensions of life . The trailer of the film was released in January 2019. The film was theatrically released on 8 February 2019.

Plot 
The story is subdivided into three parts. The first part of the story is about an insomniac, depressed wife of a dominating man. The lady finds solace in an employee of her husband, who tries to get her out of the situation. However, he fails in his attempts, and the lady is forced to commit suicide. The second part is about an aged man falling in love with a young woman. The third part is about an HIV patient, who is taken care of by a male nurse, who wins his heart. At the end of the film, it is revealed that all the characters are somehow related to the others. Finally, we discover that the story is not actually divided into parts.

Cast 
 Arjun Chakrabarty
 Anjan Dutt
 Raima Sen
 Anirban Bhattacharya
 Arindam Sil
 Sauraseni Maitra
 Sourav Das
 Suprabhat Das

Soundtrack

Release
The official trailer of the film was unveiled by SVF on 16 January 2019.

References

External links
 

Films directed by Anjan Dutt
Indian drama films
2019 films
Bengali-language Indian films
2010s Bengali-language films